Heidi Robbins (born July 3, 1991) is an American rower. She was part of the team that won the gold medal in the women's eight competition at the 2014 World Rowing Championships.

References
 Heidi Robbins at USRowing
 

1991 births
Living people
American female rowers
Rowers from Seattle
World Rowing Championships medalists for the United States
21st-century American women